The  Jackson House is a historic house located at 703 Jackson Street in Winnsboro in Franklin Parish, Louisiana.

Built in 1900 in Queen Anne style, the house is distinguished by "three semi-hexagonal bays set beneath gables, its curving Eastlake front gallery, and its decoratively cut brackets and gable aprons. There is also a large forward facing gable on the front and side facades which encompasses the smaller gable over the bay. The house also features plate glass windows, clapboard sheathing, and Colonial Revival mantels."

It was moved to its present location in 1980 when widening of Louisiana Highway 165 endangered the building.  In 1982, it was used as a restaurant.

The house was listed on the National Register of Historic Places on September 21, 1982.

See also
National Register of Historic Places listings in Franklin Parish, Louisiana

References

Houses on the National Register of Historic Places in Louisiana
Houses completed in 1900
Queen Anne architecture in Louisiana
Franklin Parish, Louisiana